John Elliott may refer to:

Entertainment
 John Elliott (artist) (1858–1925), English artist
 John Elliott (actor) (1876–1956), American actor
 John M. Elliott Jr. (active since 1970), makeup artist
 John Elliott (electronic musician) (born 1984), American electronic musician

Politics
 John Elliott (Georgia politician) (1773–1827), U.S. Senator from Georgia
 John Milton Elliott (1820–1879), legislator from Kentucky
 John Campbell Elliott (1872–1941), Canadian lawyer and politician
 John Banks Elliott (1917–2018), Ghana's ambassador to the USSR
 John C. Elliott (1919–2001), Governor of American Samoa
 John Elliott (New Zealand politician) (1938–2022), New Zealand politician

Sports
 John S. Elliott (1889–1950), American football coach
 John Elliott (British boxer) (1901–1945), British boxer of the 1920s
 John Elliott (Jamaican boxer) (1931–2015), Jamaican boxer
 John Elliott (wrestler) (born 1934), Australian Olympic wrestler
 John Elliott (cricketer) (born 1942), English cricketer
 John Elliott (defensive lineman) (1944–2010), American football defensive tackle
 John Elliott (golfer) (born 1963), American professional golfer
 Jumbo Elliott (American football) (John Elliott, born 1965)

Other
 John Elliott (physician) (fl. 1690), adherent of James II
 John F. Elliott (1920–1991), American professor of metallurgy
 John Elliott (historian) (1930–2022), British historian
 John H. Elliott (biblical scholar) (1935–2020), New Testament scholar
 John Elliott (architect) (1936–2010), English architect
 John Elliott (businessman) (1941–2021), Australian businessman and prominent Liberal

See also
John Eliot (disambiguation)
John Elliot (disambiguation)
Jon Elliott (born 1947), radio presenter
Jack Elliott (disambiguation)